The Samsung NX 60mm F2.8 Macro ED OIS SSA is an interchangeable macro lens for Samsung NX-mount, announced by Samsung on February 21, 2011.

References
http://www.dpreview.com/products/samsung/lenses/samsung_60_2p8/specifications

60
Macro lenses
Camera lenses introduced in 2011